Hubert Edwin "Hub" Bechtol (April 20, 1926 – October 22, 2004) was a college football player for the Texas Tech Red Raiders and the Texas Longhorns. He was a 3 Time All-American at The University of Texas at Austin in 1944, 1945, and 1946. He became the first Southwest Conference player to receive 3 All-American honors and this later led to his election to the College Football Hall of Fame in 1991.  He died on October 22, 2004.

References

External links
 
 

1926 births
2004 deaths
American football ends
Baltimore Colts (1947–1950) players
Texas Tech Red Raiders football players
Texas Longhorns football players
All-American college football players
College Football Hall of Fame inductees
Sportspeople from Amarillo, Texas
Sportspeople from Lubbock, Texas
Players of American football from Texas
Lubbock High School alumni